Akie Yoshizawa (吉沢 秋絵, Yoshizawa Akie, born October 20, 1968, in Tokyo, Japan) is a former Japanese idol, singer and actress in the 1980s. She made her debut in 1985, simultaneously selected as a member of Jpop female band Onyanko Club and as an actress in the TV series Sukeban Deka II as one of the three main parts.  This led to appearances by her band in two episodes. She released a few solo discs before she retired, and married in 1996.

Biography
She was born in Higashimurayama, a suburb of Tokyo, but subsequently moved to Sayama in Saitama Prefecture. 

In August 1985, she auditioned for the variety show  on Fuji TV and was accepted. Unlike usually, the audition at this time also served as a recruitment for the regular cast of the TV drama Sukeban Deka II. Therefore, she was selected not only to be a member of Onyanko Club, but also to appear regularly in that drama as one of the two semi-lead actresses who support the lead actress, Yōko Minamino, along with Haruko Sagara. Moreover, the winner of this audition was also promised to sing the theme song for Sukeban Deka II. In November 1985, she became the second Onyanko Club member, after Sonoko Kawai, to make her solo debut with the song . More strictly speaking, the song was released under the name Akie Yoshizawa with Onyanko Club.

In March 1986, she released a new theme song for the drama, which ranked No. 1 on the Oricon chart in its first appearance. In June 1986, she released her first solo album, . In September 1986, she graduated from Onyanko Club along with popular members such as Eri Nitta and Satomi Fukunaga. In addition, a song titled  was released as a single to commemorate her graduation. Therefore, she somehow managed to arrive 15 minutes before 5:00 p.m., when Yūyake Nyan Nyan was to be broadcast. In October 1986, her radio program called  started on Nippon Broadcasting System. In November 1986, she starred in an idol drama called , written by manga artist Makoto Kobayashi. In December 1986, she released her first song as a solo artist, . 

In August 1987, Tōei premiered a movie called , in which she played the heroine. She also released a song called , the theme song for the movie. Moreover, she hosted  on TV Asahi, a variety show for children, along with TV personality . 

In 1991, she retired from the entertainment industry and became a writer for a fashion magazine.She then became an editor at a publishing house, . In 1993, she published a book titled  In 1996, she married and lived abroad for a time before returning home.

Discography
Singles

Naze? no Arashi -  1985
Kisetsuhazureno Koi - 1986
Kagami no Naka no Watashi - 1986
Ryuuseino Marionette - 1986
Signal no Mukouni - 1987
Ame no Hanabi - 1987
Anata yori Sutekina Hito - 1990

Albums

Kanojo no Natsu - 1986
Aoi Tori o Sagashite -  1987
Charming -  1987

Compilations

Milky Mind - 1988
Paris e Ikkitai - 1992
Kanojo no Natsu + Single Collection

Videos

Further reading

References

External links
 Akie Yoshizawa on Idollica
 Akie Yoshizawa on the IMDB
 Akie Yoshizawa profile on Onyanko Club fansite database

Onyanko Club
Japanese idols
Japanese women pop singers
Japanese actresses
Living people
1968 births
Musicians from Saitama Prefecture